Marcos Luis Rocha Aquino (born 11 December 1988) is a Brazilian footballer who plays for Palmeiras as a right back.

Club career

Born in Sete Lagoas, Minas Gerais, Marcos Rocha joined Atlético Mineiro's youth setup in 2005, from hometown's Bela Vista FC. He was promoted to the main squad in 2008, but made his senior debuts while on loan at Uberlândia EC.

Marcos Rocha made his professional debuts late in the year, representing CRB also in a temporary deal. He returned to Atlético in January 2009, mainly as a backup to Sheslon; after the latter's injury he made his debut for Galo, starting in a 3–0 away win against Social on 7 February 2009, for the Campeonato Mineiro championship.

Marcos Rocha made his Série A debut on 16 May 2009, replacing Jonílson in the 82nd minute of a 2–1 home win against Grêmio. He appeared in ten matches during the campaign, scoring once (against Avaí on 20 August).

On 25 February 2010 Marcos Rocha was loaned to Ponte Preta. After appearing sparingly he moved to América Mineiro, featuring regularly over the course of nearly two years.

On 30 November 2011, it was confirmed that Marcos Rocha would return to Atlético. He was immediately elected as first-choice, and was among the squad which won the state league twice, the Copa Libertadores in 2013, and the Recopa Sudamericana and Copa do Brasil in 2014.

On 10 January 2019, Marcos Rocha signed a four-year contract with Palmeiras.

Career statistics

Club

International

Honours

Club
Atlético Mineiro
Campeonato Mineiro: 2012, 2013, 2015, 2017
Copa Libertadores: 2013
Recopa Sudamericana: 2014
Copa do Brasil: 2014
Palmeiras
Campeonato Brasileiro Série A: 2018, 2022
Campeonato Paulista: 2020, 2022
Copa Libertadores: 2020, 2021
Recopa Sudamericana: 2022
Copa do Brasil:  2020

Individual
 Bola de Prata: 2012, 2014, 2022
 Campeonato Brasileiro Série A Team of the Year: 2012, 2013, 2014, 2015, 2022
 South American Team of the Year: 2013
Campeonato Paulista Team of the year: 2018

References

External links
 

1988 births
Living people
Sportspeople from Minas Gerais
Brazilian footballers
Association football defenders
Campeonato Brasileiro Série A players
Campeonato Brasileiro Série B players
Clube Atlético Mineiro players
Uberlândia Esporte Clube players
Associação Atlética Ponte Preta players
Clube de Regatas Brasil players
América Futebol Clube (MG) players
Sociedade Esportiva Palmeiras players
Brazil international footballers